Martyr Plot is an alternative rock band formed by Marilyn Manson drummer Kenny Wilson (AKA Ginger Fish). Dave Scott plays guitar and vocals, and James Marino plays bass. They wrote the songs "Let it Go" and "Conviction."

External links
MusicMight

American alternative rock groups